Chernihiv-Arena is mainly used by the club FC Chernigiv and sometimes by FC Desna 2. It is located in the district of ZAZ, in Kiltseva St, 2а, Chernihiv, Chernihiv Oblast, Ukraine 14039.

Description
It consists of a football field with artificial turf, an office building with locker rooms and showers, a room for coaches, a club office, and parking. An artificial grass field with 300 people stands. Small children's sporthall, sports shop and club museum. There is a rainwater collection system, solar panels and a modern heating system. There is a children's gym, a sports shop and a club museum. Internet is available throughout the stadium at the entire territory of the stadium. There is a rainwater collection system, solar panels and a modern heating system and also two mini-football pitches and one multisport field (you can play basketball, tennis and volleyball).

History

Origin
In 2012, the club's management made the first attempts to find land for the construction of the stadium. Yuri Sinitsa, founder of the Collar company, which produces goods for pets, undertook to build a football field at ZAZ. The project investor is one of the company's divisions, the Kit and Pes enterprise. After the established of the football club FC Chernihiv, the owner of the team, Yury Yuryevich noticed that the existing stadium do not match the standards like Lokomotiv stadium (located not far from the Chernihiv Ovruch railway) and the Olympic sports training center is the Desna Chernihiv football field, its rent was quite high, and it was not always possible to play there and at this point he start developing his idea that a team needs its own infrastructure.

At the end of 2014, local authorities gave permission to develop a project for the area.

In the summer of 2016, the first construction work started and after 11 months, in May 2017, the football field, the building with changing rooms and showers, all communications, roads, parking lots were ready to receive visitors.

In 2017, Chernihiv city Mayor Vladyslav Atroshenko, addressing the investor of this project, Yuriy Synytsya (PE "Cat and Dog"), noted that the idea of building this facility at his own expense is worthy of admiration and imitation.

As the company's founder Yuriy Synytsya said at a meeting with Japanese partners on July 24, in 2017 a children's football school with modern teaching methods and coaches trained abroad will start working here. Over the next 4–5 years, the Chernigiv Arena will have covered grandstands for 5,000 visitors, a swimming pool and tennis courts. Investors hope that the modern sports complex will revive the ZAZ neighborhood and create favorable conditions for the development of sports in the city as a whole.

Accreditation by Ukrainian UAF
In the summer of 2020, "Chernigiv Arena" received accreditation from the UAF to host Ukrainian Second League matches. In the same year the main club of the city, Desna Chernihiv rent "Chernigiv-Arena" for their own teams U-21 and U-19.

In November 2020, the main football field was replaced with professional ones made of special material. A cafe appeared; ticket office; club paraphernalia shop; toilets, including for the disabled. The main tribune has been expanded with the addition of a separate area for members of the press.

On the second tier of the podium there is a box for VIP guests. The coaching benches are removed at the required distance for the proper organization of the technical zone. There is a guest tribune for fans of visiting teams. Flagpoles have been installed for the flags of the competition organizers. The fence of the stadium has been increased, an area for comfortable entrance of fans has been formed, additional passages have been organized. Also in January 2021 Desna Chernihiv, the main team of the city trained in the field for the preparation of the league.

Expansion, Tribunes & Damage 
In summer 2021, after the historical season 2020-21 of FC Chernihiv in Ukrainian Second League, the management of the club announced that official blog on the Tribune has opened. On 31 August the Chernihiv Arena hosted the first match of Ukrainian Cup in the season 2021–22 between FC Chernihiv against Alians Lypova Dolyna.

On 9 March 2022, during the Siege of Chernihiv during the 2022 Russian invasion of Ukraine the stadium was damaged, as well as part of the administrative building and locker rooms, the box office, the fan shop and the stele, which boasts the name of the stadium. In April 2022 the due to the FC Chernihiv press service informed that the Fakhіvtsі carried out a deconstruction of Chernihiv Arena and cleaned up all the non-violent items that they had spent on the territory of the stadium. On 20 April 2022, the employees of FC Chernihiv began cleaning the territory of the club stadium, which was damaged by shelling by Russian aggressors. In the process of work it is necessary to clean office buildings from broken glass, dispose of the remains of unusable structures, as well as remove the fragments of shells, which are littered with literally everything. On 24 April 2022, was held the first friendly football match since the beginning of hostilities. On 26 April 2022, the players of FC Chernihiv held their first training session at the home stadium since the beginning of the war. Before the lesson, the boys and the staff collected debris that flew to the site, clearing their lawn. Thus, in fact, the whole team took part in the cleaning of the stadium, which will continue. The players who were in the city were joined in the two-sided game by head coach Valeriy Chornyi, goalkeeping coach Artem Padun, team administrator Dmytro Avramenko and Chernihiv Arena director Anatoliy Dudchyk. This training is a real symbol of the revival of Chernihiv, football in our city and Chernihiv tigers, - said in a statement. At the end of July 2022, the Chernihiv-Arena was brought to order after shelling with rockets, in particular the double-glazed windows in the administrative building damaged by debris have been replaced. In August 2022, the club of FC Chernihiv who own the Stadium appeal to all organizations, sports clubs and all people to provide help by donation for the revival of Football Sport Complex in Chernihiv, after the full-scale Russian aggression.

Sports Facilities
 Soccer
 Basketball
 Tennis
 Volleyball

Transport connections
 There are many connection to the stadium from Krasna Square that stop just beside the stadium by the Myru Avenue

Using
 The stadium hosts home matches of FC Chernihiv in the Ukrainian Amateur Football Championship, and from 2020 - in the Ukrainian Second League
 The Stadium hosted also match of Ukrainian Cup in the season 2021-22.
 In addition, Chernihiv's Desna leases Chernihiv-Arena for its Desna U-21 and Desna U-19 games.
 The stadium plays matches of the DUFLU championship of the Desna and Yunost sports school teams, the Chernihiv city championship, the Chernihiv region championship, the veterans' championship, as well as the annual USB Cup and Winter Spark tournaments.
 The matches of the Ukrainian Women's League and First Leagues  of the Championship of Ukraine among women's teams, trainings and friendly matches of the Ukrainian Women's National Team of Ukraine.
 The Chernihiv Arena hosted also some friendly matches of Desna Chernihiv, the main team of Chernihiv.

Gallery

See also
 List of sports venues in Chernihiv

References

External links
FC Chernigiv Official Website
Ukrainian Premier League
Chernigiv-Arena Pictures
Chernigiv-Arena Construction Time Lapse 2016-2017 Video
Chernigiv-Arena - wikimapia.org
Chernigiv-Arena Video
Chernigiv-Arena Video
Chernigiv-Arena Construction Time Lapse 2016-2017 Video

Football venues in Chernihiv
Football venues in Chernihiv Oblast
Sports venues in Chernihiv
FC Desna Chernihiv
FC Chernihiv
Multi-purpose stadiums in Ukraine
Buildings and structures in Chernihiv
Football venues in Ukraine
Sports venues in Chernihiv Oblast
Sports venues completed in 2016
Sports complexes in Ukraine
2016 establishments in Ukraine